This is a list of media in Medicine Hat, Alberta.

Radio

Television
Medicine Hat is not designated as a mandatory market for digital television conversion. All broadcasting stations broadcast only in analogue.

There are two "cable" television providers in Medicine Hat, Shaw Communications and Telus. Shaw carries American network affiliates from Spokane, Washington.

Medicine Hat has not had over-the-air English-language CBC Television service since CHAT-TV disaffiliated from the network in 2008.  CBC and Global is available only on cable or satellite in Medicine Hat, with Shaw offering CBRT-DT from Calgary to is subscribers. Alberta's Radio-Canada station, CBXFT-DT Edmonton, is also available on cable.

Print
 Medicine Hat News
 Prairie Post

Medicine Hat
Media, Medicine Hat